Leptynia attenuata is a species of stick insect from Diapheromeridae family which is endemic to Portugal.

Study
In 1998 the species was studied by Anna Paola Bianchi and Patrizia Meliado who discovered that the species have 36 chromosomes and is reproduced by amphigony.

References

Phasmatodea
Insects described in 1890
Endemic arthropods of Portugal